is a Japanese professional golfer.

Meshiai was born in Chiba. He turned professional in 1978. He won 11 tournaments on the Japan Golf Tour and led the money list in 1993. He is 14th on the career money list (through 2013).

Professional wins (17)

Japan Golf Tour wins (11)

*Note: Tournament shortened to 54 holes due to weather.
1Co-sanctioned by the Asia Golf Circuit

Japan Golf Tour playoff record (1–3)

Other wins (1)
1986 Acom Team Championship (with Satoshi Higashi)

Japan PGA Senior Tour wins (5)
2005 Kinojo Senior Open
2008 Starts Senior Golf Tournament, Akira Kobayashi Invitational Sanko Senior Golf Tournament
2009 Fujifilm Senior Championship
2016 Kanehide Senior Okinawa Open

Results in major championships

CUT = missed the half-way cut
"T" = tied

Team appearances
Kirin Cup (representing Japan): 1987
Dunhill Cup (representing Japan): 1988, 1989, 1990, 1996
Dynasty Cup (representing Japan): 2003

See also
List of golfers with most Japan Golf Tour wins

References

External links

Japanese male golfers
Japan Golf Tour golfers
PGA Tour Champions golfers
Komazawa University alumni
Sportspeople from Chiba Prefecture
1954 births
Living people